Sideways is an album by Norwegian guitarist and composer Jacob Young released on the ECM label in 2008.

Reception

AllMusic awarded the album 4 stars and in its review by Matt Collar, states "Much like other ECM releases, with its mix of laid-back edginess and ambient, searching improvisations, Sideways works just as well on a cerebral, engaging level as on a background, afterglow level". On All About Jazz Budd Kopman observed "Sideways is remarkable in how its many layers interact to produce music that combines beauty and intellectual rigor" while John Kelman wrote "Young's very strength is his ability to compel and evoke in the most understated fashion. The beautifully spacious Sideways finds him comfortably evolving, bringing together his personal biculturalism with a musical cosmopolitanism that transcends any single stylistic authority".

Track listing 
All compositions by Jacob Young
 "Sideways" – 6:41  
 "Time Rebel" – 5:14  
 "Slow Bo-Bo" – 5:07  
 "Near South End" – 5:26  
 "Out of Night" – 10:16  
 "Hanna's Lament" – 4:02  
 "St. Ella" – 4:35  
 "Maybe We Can" – 6:53  
 "Wide Asleep" – 5:30  
 "Gazing at Stars" – 2:03

Personnel 
Jacob Young – guitar 
Mathias Eick – trumpet 
Vidar Johansen – bass clarinet, tenor saxophone
Mats Eilertsen – bass 
Jon Christensen – drums

Credits 
Engineered by Jan Erik Kongshaug 
Design by Sascha Kleis
Liner photos by Colin Eick 
Produced by Manfred Eicher

Notes 
Recorded at Rainbow Studio in Oslo, Norway in May 2006

References 

ECM Records albums
Jacob Young (musician) albums
2008 albums
Albums produced by Manfred Eicher